Foreland Point is a rocky headland in Devon near Lynmouth, and is the most northerly point along the Devon and Exmoor coast. The headland is owned by the National Trust; some areas are open to public access all year, as part of the South West Coast Path, while other areas have limited access. The Trinity House-operated Lynmouth Foreland Lighthouse is also located here.

The area of the sea between Bideford and Foreland Point is a Marine Conservation Zone.

References

Headlands of Devon
Bristol Channel
Protected areas of Devon
National Trust properties in Devon